Tezrao (also spelled Tezro) was a daily express train (5-Up/6-Down) service in Pakistan. The train ran between Karachi and Peshawar. Its name was changed to Zulfiqar Express during the Peoples Party government. After the Peoples Party government its name changed again to Tezrao.
The train had economy and first-class sleeper accommodation. It was suspended on 20 July 2010 due to lack of locomotives.

Route 
Karachi to Peshawar via Hyderabad, Rohri, Khanewal, Lahore and Rawalpindi

Station stops

References

External links
 Pakistan Railway Train Timings

Named passenger trains of Pakistan
Passenger trains in Pakistan